Wolley Stille, also known as the Joseph Sharpless House, is a historic home located at Wallingford, Delaware County, Pennsylvania. It is a fieldstone dwelling that consists of a two-story, pre-1700 building, with a Great Hall dated to 1700; a two-story addition built in 1751; and a service wing added in 1916.  The house exhibits both Swedish and English Colonial elements of design and construction. The house was restored in 1915–1916, by architect Donald Robb, also added some Colonial Revival elements, such as enlarged dormer windows.

It was added to the National Register of Historic Places in 1980.

References

Houses on the National Register of Historic Places in Pennsylvania
Colonial Revival architecture in Pennsylvania
Houses completed in 1751
Houses in Delaware County, Pennsylvania
National Register of Historic Places in Delaware County, Pennsylvania
1751 establishments in the Thirteen Colonies